The Uganda Law Society (ULS) is an association of lawyers charged with ensuring high levels of professionalism among lawyers in Uganda.

Mission
The Mission statement is: To Develop a Skilled and Empowered Legal Profession in Execution of its Statutory Mandate to Foster and Improve Access to and Administration of Justice as well as Good Governance in Uganda.

The ULS Vision is: To be a Proficient Bar Association in Fostering Access to Justice, the Rule of Law and Good Governance in Uganda.

Objectives
The Strategic Goal of the Uganda Law Society is: Efficient Legal Service Delivery to ensure Access to Justice and Observance of the Rule of Law for Positive Social Transformation.

The Strategic Objectives of the Uganda Law Society are:
To promote members’ professional development and ethical conduct;
To promote access to justice for Indigent, marginalized and vulnerable persons in Uganda;
To contribute to upholding and promoting the rule of law in Uganda;
To strengthen the institutional capacity of the ULS to become a modern Bar Association.

The Uganda Law Society was formed by an act of Parliament in 1956. The ULS is governed by an executive council with representatives from each of the four regions of Uganda. It is a member of the East Africa Law Society, which also includes member countries Kenya, Tanzania, Rwanda and Burundi.

Projects
Legal Aid Project (LAP)

The Legal Aid Project (LAP) was established by the Uganda Law Society in 1992, with assistance from the Norwegian Bar Association, to provide legal assistance to indigent and vulnerable people in Uganda.

The Project was born out of the realization that apart from the state brief system that handles only capital offences, and the huge backlog of cases, there is no statutory free legal aid provision in Uganda despite the fact that a large part of Uganda's population lives below the poverty line, and without means to access justice.

To date, the project has helped and continues to help thousands of indigent men, women and children to realize their legal and human rights.

LAP has branches in Kabarole, Kabale, Masindi, Jinja, Gulu, Arua, Soroti, Mbarara, Moroto and its head office in Kampala.

The Pro-Bono Project
Pro-bono services in Uganda are premised on the fact that a significant proportion of the Ugandan population lives in abject poverty. This leads to limited access to justice as they cannot pursue the same due to the high related costs. According to the National Development Plan, the Justice, Law and Order Sector (JLOS) notes that the key barriers to access to justice include: growing caseloads, physical distance to service institutions, technical barriers, poverty, and lack of access by women and marginalized groups. It further indicates that women experience more barriers in accessing justice because they have higher illiteracy levels and lack information about legal rights. To this end, prevailing poverty and its attendant restriction on mobility limits access to legal services and as such occasions injustice.

The Pro-bono Scheme of the Uganda Law Society was initiated as a pilot project by the Uganda Law Society in partnership with the Ministry of Justice and Constitutional Affairs, (Law Council) supported by the Legal Aid Basket Fund (LABF) in 2008.
The Project currently covers the districts of Kampala, Gulu, Jinja, Kabale, Kabarole, Masindi, Soroti, Arua and Mbarara through the satellite clinics of the Legal Aid Project (LAP) of the Uganda Law Society.

Democratic Governance for Development (DGD) Project

This partnership between Avocats Sans Frontières (ASF) and Uganda Law Society (ULS) focuses on Mobilizing Lawyers for the Rights of Ugandans. The implementation of the project is largely funded by the DGD project.

References

African bar associations
Law of Uganda